DXCB (93.9 FM), broadcasting as 93.9 Star FM, is a radio station owned and operated by Bombo Radyo Philippines through its licensee People's Broadcasting Service, Inc. Its studio, offices and transmitter are located at the 4th floor AJS Bldg., Concuera cor. Valderosa St., Zamboanga City.

It is one of the Star FM stations formerly licensed to Consolidated Broadcasting System from its inception in 1995 to 2018, when their licensee was transferred to People's Broadcasting Service.

This frequency was formerly used by DXWR under Radio Mindanao Network from 1978 to 1986, when it transferred to 96.3 MHz.

References

External links
Star FM Zamboanga FB Page
Star FM Zamboanga Website

Radio stations established in 1995
Radio stations in Zamboanga City
Bombo Radyo Philippines